1 Medical Regiment is a medical regiment of the British Army's Royal Army Medical Corps currently based at Bhurtpore Barracks, Tidworth Camp, Wiltshire.

History
The regiment was formed as 1 Close Support Medical Regiment on 1 April 2000, by the amalgamation of 2 and 3 armoured field ambulances.  It was initially based in York Barracks in Munster, becoming 1 Medical Regiment on 1 April 2008, moving to Haig Barracks in Bergen-Hohne Garrison on 4 July 2012.  It became 1 Armoured Medical Regiment on 1 April 2014, with the formation parade held in Bergen-Hohne on 5 July 2014. The Regiment moved to Dempsey Barracks in Sennelager in September 2015, supporting 20th Armoured Brigade.
 
The regiment deployed to Afghanistan on Operation Herrick 15 in October 2011 for six months, and for Operation Herrick 20, 30 Squadron deployed to provide the core of the last medical regiment in Afghanistan.

The Regiment is paired with 335 Medical Evacuation Regiment, a specialist Army Reserve unit.

In 2019 the regiment was due to move to Bhurtpore Barracks.

Under the Future Soldier programme, the regiment will be redesignated as the 1st Close Support Medical Regiment and re-subordinate to the 20th Armoured Brigade Combat Team and re-structure by May 2023.

References

External links
 

01
Military units and formations established in 2000